Crisis response team may refer to:
 A SWAT team
 An emergency response team focusing on post trauma counseling